Undercover Boss is an American 2010 reality television series, based on the British series of the same name. The first episode of the first season premiered on February 7, 2010, after Super Bowl XLIV, and featured Bob O'Donnell, president and chief operating officer of Waste Management, Inc. On March 9, 2010, CBS announced it had renewed Undercover Boss for a second season. On July 28, 2010, CBS announced four company executives had signed up for the second season of Undercover Boss, the executives are from NASCAR, DirecTV, Chiquita Brands International and Great Wolf Lodge, Inc. The Choice Hotels CEO, Steve Joyce, was the first boss for the second season of the show on September 26, 2010. On March 27, 2011, CBS officially renewed Undercover Boss for a third season. On May 18, 2011, CBS then announced that it would be holding the show for a mid-season replacement to premiere Sunday January 15, 2012, with an undetermined number of episodes. The third season premiered on January 15, 2012. The fourth season premiered on November 2, 2012.  The fifth season premiered on September 27, 2013. The sixth season premiered on December 14, 2014. The eighth season premiered on December 21, 2016.

Overview

Episodes

Season 1 (2010)

Season 2 (2010–11)

Season 3 (2012)

Season 4 (2012–13)

Season 5 (2013–14)

Season 6 (2014–15)

Season 7 (2015–16)

Season 8 (2016–17)

Season 9: Celebrity Undercover Boss (2018)

Season 10 (2020)

Season 11 (2022)

References

External links
 
 

Episodes (United States)
Lists of American reality television series episodes